Bailaho is a brand for a German-language business directory for the business-to-business sector. Trademark owner is the company Bailaho GmbH based in Baden-Baden in Germany. The brand has been on the market in Germany, Austria and Switzerland since 2011.

References

External links 
 Official Website Bailaho Germany
 Official Website Bailaho Austria
 Official Website Bailaho Switzerland

German brands
Trademarks
Directories